The Albatros L.66 was a simple, low powered, two seat sports and training parasol wing monoplane, built in Germany in the mid-1920s.

Design and development
The L.66 was intended to be a low cost, easy maintenance two-seater. Thus a low power engine was required and the prototype was fitted with a  Haacke HFM-2 flat twin, though other engines could be used. It was a cantilever parasol monoplane with an aerodynamically thick airfoil section wing, which had a simple, rectangular plan and significant dihedral.  The wing was a wooden structure with two spars, the ailerons mounted directly to a rounded groove in the rear spar.  It was linked to the upper fuselage by a rather complicated set of struts.

Traditionally, Albatros had constructed fuselages with wood frames, but the L.66 marked a departure, with a welded steel tube longeron and strut framework covered with fabric. The sides were flat and almost airfoil-shaped, with a blunt, rounded nose and taper aft. The nose-mounted engine, driving a two-blade propeller, was raised above the fuselage with a fairing behind it, enclosing the oil tank and with the instrument panel attached to its rear. The fuel tank was in the wing centre section, feeding the engine by gravity. The empennage was simple in shape and action as there were no fixed surfaces, only an all-moving rudder and elevator. Both control surfaces were balanced. The conventional undercarriage was also very simple, with the mainwheels attached to a single axle which passed through the fuselage, sitting the L.66 close to the ground. The tailskid was linked to the rudder for steering on the ground

Operational history

The first L.66 was flying in mid-1924 with the Haacke engine. In all ten were built.

Variants
L.66 Haacke engine.
L.66a Slightly larger and heavier, with Stahlwerk Mark St.M3 or Anzani engine.
L.66c
L.67Lighter version, Bristol Cherub or Anzani engine. Two built.

Specifications (Haacke engine)

References

1920s German sport aircraft
Parasol-wing aircraft
L 066
Single-engined tractor aircraft
Aircraft first flown in 1924